Kurumbalur is a panchayat town in Perambalur district in the Indian state of Tamil Nadu.

Demographics
 India census, Kurumbalur had a population of 21,702. Males constitute 50% (10,867) of the population and females 50% (10, 835). Kurumbalur has an average literacy rate of 64%, higher than the national average of 59.5%: male literacy is 72%, and female literacy is 56%. In Kurumbalur, 10% of the population is under 6 years of age.

Kurumbalur is town panchayat including Palayam, Moolakaadu, Mettangaadu, Puthur and Eachampatti villages.

References

Cities and towns in Perambalur district